Pope Marinus I (died 15 May 884) was the bishop of Rome and ruler of the Papal States from 882 until his death. Controversially at the time, he was already a bishop when he became pope, and had served as papal legate to Constantinople. He was also erroneously called Martin II (Martinus II) leading to the second pope named Martin to take the name Martin IV.

Ecclesiastical career
Born at Gallese, Marinus was the son of a priest. He was ordained as a deacon by Pope Nicholas I. He first served as bishop of Caere. On three separate occasions, he had been employed by the three popes who preceded him as legate to Constantinople, his mission in each case having reference to the controversy started by Patriarch Photios I of Constantinople. In 882, he was sent on behalf of Pope John VIII to Duke Athanasius of Naples to warn him not to trade with the Muslims of southern Italy.

Marinus I was elected to succeed John VIII as bishop of Rome from around the end of December 882. This papal election was controversial because Marinus had already been consecrated as bishop of Caere; at the time, a bishop was expected never to move to another see. Among his first acts as pope were the restitution of Formosus as cardinal bishop of Portus and the anathematizing of Photius I.  Due to his respect for Alfred the Great (r. 871–899), he freed the Anglo-Saxons of the Schola Anglorum in Rome from tribute and taxation. He also is recorded to have sent a piece of the True Cross to Alfred as a gift. He died in May or June 884, his successor being Adrian III.

Name error
Because of the similarity of the names, Marinus I and Marinus II were, in some sources, mistakenly called Martinus II and Martinus III.

References

Further reading

External links
 Opera Omnia by Migne Patrologia Latina with analytical indexes

Popes
Italian popes
Diplomats of the Holy See
884 deaths
9th-century archbishops
Year of birth unknown
9th-century popes
830 births
Burials at St. Peter's Basilica